The Board of Studies was the state government education board in New South Wales, Australia from 1990 to 2013. It provided educational leadership by developing the curriculum from Kindergarten to Year 12 and awarding the secondary school credentials Record of School Achievement and Higher School Certificate.

The Board of Studies amalgamated with the NSW Institute of Teachers on 1 January 2014 to form the Board of Studies, Teaching and Educational Standards NSW (BOSTES).

Presidents of the Board of Studies
Tom Alegounarias (2009–2013)
Gordon Stanley (1998–2008)
Sam Weller (1994–1997) (deceased)
John Lambert (1990–1994) (deceased)

See also
 Victorian Curriculum and Assessment Authority

References

External links 

Board of Studies Online Testing Application
Previous Years HSC Exam Papers

Education in New South Wales